Taioalo "Junior" Vaivai (born 18 January 1990) is a Professional Rugby League player. He has previously played for the Penrith Panthers, Hull Kingston Rovers and the South Sydney Rabbitohs in the National Rugby League.

Background
Vaivai was born in Auckland, New Zealand. He also played his junior football for Redbank Plains Bears in the Ipswich junior rugby league. Vaivai played his junior rugby league for the Goodna Eagles and the Easts Tigers in Brisbane, Australia. 
Vaivai has previously worked as a personal trainer at Aventus Health and Fitness, in Warrawong, Australia.
He is the cousin of American professional wrestler and actor, Dwayne "The Rock" Johnson.

Senior career

South Sydney Rabbitohs (2009–11) 
Covering for an injury to Beau Champion, Vaivai made his National Rugby League début in round 24 of the 2009 season, against the Penrith Panthers.
In 2009 and 2010, he played for the South Sydney Rabbitohs in the National Youth Competition. Vaivai scored 40 tries in 40 matches and kicked 40 goals from 42 attempts .
Vaivai was also named in Steve Price’s Toa Samoa squad in 2010 but was ruled out due to injury.

Penrith Panthers (2011) 
Vaivai joined Penrith for the remainder of the 2011 season, making his club début as a late call-up to cover for an injury to Luke Lewis.

Illawarra Cutters (2013) 
In 2013, Vaivai joined the Illawarra Cutters in the New South Wales Cup.

Western Suburbs Red Devils (2017) 
In 2017, Vaivai played for the Western Suburbs Red Devils in the Illawarra Rugby League competition.

Hull Kingston Rovers (2018 – present) 
In February 2018, Vaivai signed a one-year contract with Hull Kingston Rovers in the Super League. After a lengthy and drawn-out Visa application process, which frustratingly prevented Vaivai from making his début for Hull Kingston Rovers, Taioalo finally made his first appearance for Hull Kingston Rovers in round 11 of the 2018 Super League season, in a 40–26 defeat against the Warrington Wolves at the Halliwell Jones Stadium.
Vaivai scored his first try for Hull Kingston Rovers on 13 May 2018, in a 10–28 Challenge Cup home defeat against Wigan at Craven Park.
It was revealed on 2 July 2018, that Vaivai had signed a new two-year contract extension to play and remain at Hull Kingston Rovers until at least the end of the 2020 rugby league season.

York City Knights (Loan) 
It was announced on 23 May 2019, that Vaivai had joined the York City Knights on a one month loan deal with fellow Hull Kingston Rovers' teammate, Will Oakes. On 26 May 2019, Vaivai made a try-scoring début for York City in a 12–16 victory over Widnes.

Toulouse Olympique
In 2019, Vaivai joined RFL Championship side Toulouse Olympique and was part of the side which gained promotion to the Super League after defeating Featherstone in the 2021 Million Pound Game. On 18 May 2022, Vaivai announced he was departing Toulouse with immediate effect.

Representative career

USA (2016–17) 
Qualifying through his American Samoan mother and grandmother, Vaivai made his début for the United States in their 2016 America's Cup match against Jamaica.

On 24 September 2017, Vaivai was named in the United States' 23-man squad for the 2017 Rugby League World Cup.

Representative career statistics

Honours

Individual Honours (Career Awards and Accolades)
2009 National Youth Competition: 'Team of the Year'

References

1990 births
Living people
Eastern Suburbs Tigers players
Hull Kingston Rovers players
Illawarra Cutters players
New Zealand emigrants to Australia
New Zealand people of American Samoan descent
New Zealand expatriate sportspeople
New Zealand rugby league players
Penrith Panthers players
Rugby league centres
Rugby league players from Auckland
South Sydney Rabbitohs players
Toulouse Olympique players
United States national rugby league team players
Windsor Wolves players
York City Knights players